Prionapteryx achatina is a moth in the family Crambidae. It was described by Zeller in 1863. It is found in North America, where it has been recorded from Arizona, Colorado, Florida, Georgia, Indiana, Maryland, Massachusetts, Minnesota, New Hampshire, New Jersey, North Carolina, Ohio, South Carolina and Wisconsin.

References

Ancylolomiini
Moths described in 1863
Endemic fauna of the United States